Fan Peipei (Chinese: 范培培; born 11 January 1985) is a Chinese football player who currently plays for China League Two side Dalian Chanjoy.

Club career
In 2005, Fan Peipei started his professional footballer career with Jiangsu Sainty in the China League One. 
In July 2009, Fan transferred to Chinese Super League side Chengdu Blades. He would eventually make his league debut for Chengdu on 2 August 2009 in a game against Shaanxi Renhe.
In January 2013, Fan transferred to China League One side Chongqing Lifan.

On 21 February 2017, Fan transferred to League One side Dalian Transcendence.

Club career statistics 
Statistics accurate as of match played 11 October 2019.

Honours

Club
Jiangsu Sainty
China League One: 2008

Chongqing Lifan
China League One: 2014

References

External links
 

1985 births
Living people
Chinese footballers
Footballers from Jiangsu
Sportspeople from Nantong
Jiangsu F.C. players
Chengdu Tiancheng F.C. players
Chongqing Liangjiang Athletic F.C. players
Dalian Transcendence F.C. players
Chinese Super League players
China League One players
Association football defenders